İlknur Kobaş (born 19 July 1977) is a Turkish judoka. She competed in the women's half-middleweight event at the 1996 Summer Olympics.

References

External links
 

1977 births
Living people
Turkish female judoka
Olympic judoka of Turkey
Judoka at the 1996 Summer Olympics
Place of birth missing (living people)